Akash Chhoa Bhalobasa is a Bangladeshi Bengali-language film. The film released on 24 October 2008 all over Bangladesh.

Cast
 Riaz as Akash
 Purnima as Chhoa
 Razzak as Mir Amzad Ali
 Sharmili Ahmed as Chhoa's Grand Mother
 Prabir Mitra as Chowdhury
 Afzal Sharif as Altu
 Nasrin as Special Appearance (Song-Dance)
 Jamilur Rahman Shakha as Chhoa's Servant
 Rehana Jolly as Chowdhury's Wife
 Diti as Minu Special Appearance (Akash's Mother)

Music

Soundtrack

References

External links
 

2008 films
2008 romantic drama films
Bengali-language Bangladeshi films
Bangladeshi romantic drama films
Films scored by Habib Wahid
Films scored by S I Tutul
2000s Bengali-language films